Philip Hubert Smith (10 April 1906 – 1 November 1969) was a British automotive engineer, author and motoring journalist.

Born in Keighley, Bradford, Smith began his career began as an automotive engineer, his qualifications including being a chartered engineer and memberships of both the IMechE and the SAE. He was also the technical editor of Motor World. It is for his technical books that he is best remembered, particularly The High-Speed Two-Stroke Petrol Engine, The Scientific Design of Exhaust and Intake Systems and (edited by L. J. K. Setright) Valve Mechanisms for High-speed Engines.

In later years he lived at Ben Rhydding, in Yorkshire. He died in Wharfedale, Yorkshire in 1969.

Published books

References 

British automotive engineers
British motoring journalists
1906 births
1969 deaths